Duke Ernest II of Brunswick-Grubenhagen (1418–1466) was the second son of Duke Eric I of Brunswick-Grubenhagen and his wife, Elisabeth of Brunswick-Göttingen.

When his father died in 1427, Ernest II was still a minor.  His mother and his first cousin once removed, Otto II, acted as guardians and regents for Ernest and his brothers Henry III and Albert II, until the three brothers came of age in 1440.

When Henry III died in 1464, Ernest II abdicated and became a canon in Halberstadt.

Ernest II never married.

Princes of Grubenhagen
1418 births
1466 deaths
15th-century German people